Marin Jakoliš (born 26 December 1996) is a Croatian professional footballer who plays as a winger or forward for Cypriot First Division club AEK Larnaca, on loan from  club Angers.

Club career
On 29 January 2022, Jakoliš signed a 3.5-year contract with French club Angers. On 20 January 2023, he was loaned out to Cypriot First Division club AEK Larnaca until the end of the season.

Personal life
His brother Antonio is also a footballer. He wears the jersey number 44 as a nod to Dražen Petrović, a legendary Yugoslav basketball player who was coached by Jakoliš's father.

References

1996 births
Living people
Sportspeople from Šibenik
Croatian footballers
Association football wingers
Association football forwards
Croatia youth international footballers
Croatia under-21 international footballers
Croatian Football League players
First Football League (Croatia) players
Belgian Pro League players
Challenger Pro League players
Austrian Football Bundesliga players
Ligue 1 players
Cypriot First Division players
HNK Šibenik players
Royal Excel Mouscron players
R.E. Virton players
K.S.V. Roeselare players
FC Admira Wacker Mödling players
HNK Hajduk Split players
Angers SCO players
AEK Larnaca FC players
Croatian expatriate footballers
Croatian expatriate sportspeople in Belgium
Expatriate footballers in Belgium
Croatian expatriate sportspeople in Austria
Expatriate footballers in Austria
Croatian expatriate sportspeople in France
Expatriate footballers in France
Croatian expatriate sportspeople in Cyprus
Expatriate footballers in Cyprus